Greens Beach is a locality and small rural community in the local government area of West Tamar, in the Western Tamar Valley region of Tasmania. Bass Strait forms the northern boundary. The 2016 census determined a population of 209 for the state suburb of Greens Beach.

History
The locality was gazetted in 1967.

Road infrastructure
The West Tamar Highway runs north-west through the locality, terminating in the Greens Beach township.

References

Localities of West Tamar Council
Towns in Tasmania